Bayerotrochus quiquandoni is a species of sea snail, a marine gastropod mollusk in the family Pleurotomariidae.

References

Pleurotomariidae
Gastropods described in 2018